Hubbard High School may refer to:

Hubbard High School (Texas), Hubbard, Texas
Hubbard High School (Ohio), Hubbard, Ohio
Hubbard High School (Chicago), Chicago, Illinois
Hubbard-Radcliffe High School, Hubbard, Iowa
Emerson-Hubbard High School, Emerson, Nebraska